The MGP-31 is a scatterable Peruvian circular, plastic cased minimum metal blast resistant anti-tank blast mine. The mine has a central domed pressure plate, and a ribbed edge. It will function upside down. Little is known about the mine, and it is believed to be in service with the Peruvian armed forces.

Specifications
 Diameter: 320 mm
 Height: 130 mm

References
 Jane's Mines and Mine Clearance 2005-2006
 

Anti-tank mines